Arthur Edwin Ernest Grounds (11 September 1898 – 29 July 1951) was an Australian politician.

He was born in Moonee Ponds, Victoria. In 1950 he was elected to the Tasmanian Legislative Council as the Labor member for Launceston. He died in 1951 and was succeeded by his widow Lucy, the second woman to serve in the Legislative Council.

References

1898 births
1951 deaths
Members of the Tasmanian Legislative Council
Australian Labor Party members of the Parliament of Tasmania
20th-century Australian politicians
People from Moonee Ponds, Victoria
Politicians from Melbourne